Daniel "Dănuț" Sabou (born 4 November 1979 in Baia Mare) is a former Romanian football player. He played as a central defensive midfielder and is currently the manager of Sporting Recea.

External links
 

1979 births
Living people
CS Minaur Baia Mare (football) players
FC Vaslui players
ACF Gloria Bistrița players
CSM Unirea Alba Iulia players
Romanian footballers
Sportspeople from Baia Mare
Association football midfielders
FC Unirea Dej players